Mohamed El-Kawisah (born 8 March 1987) is a Libyan judoka. He competed at the 2016 Summer Olympics in the men's 60 kg event, in which he received a bye in the first round and was eliminated in the second round by Yeldos Smetov.

References

External links
 
 
 

1987 births
Living people
Libyan male judoka
Olympic judoka of Libya
Judoka at the 2016 Summer Olympics